The Bistra (is a massif in North Macedonia. The massif has several summits higher than 2,000 metres, with the highest being Medenica at 2,163 metres above sea level.

Limestone erosion on the mountain has created limestone fields. In the limestone region of the Bistra, there are fourteen limestone fields: Tonivoda, Govedarnik, Bardaš, Sultanica, Solomunica, Suvo Pole, Small and Big Brzovec, Čukni Topanica, Lower and Upper Poljce, Tri Bari, Tri Groba and Lazaropole. The most popular caves on the mountain are the Alilica and Kalina Dupka.

Much of the mountain's area lies within the boundaries of the Mavrovo National Park.

References

Two-thousanders of North Macedonia